Kabir Rafi is an Indian music composer, playback singer, independent pop artist, and background score artist. His first multilingual feature film in Telugu, Tamil, Hindi, Kannada & Malayalam is #PK, Released in Aug 2022. He made his full-fledged music direction debut in Telugu film manasu palike maya prema and made his Kannada commercial debut with Sugar Factory in 2022. His 1st Big banner projects are web series like Mana Mugguri Love Story  under Swapna Dutt banner Mahanati fame producer and Mrs Subbalaxmi  under Manchu Lakshmi banner manchu telefilms & Zee5. He has worked predominantly for 200 plus digital short films and independent films from 2015 to present in English, Hindi, Telugu, Kannada, Tamil, Silent films and other foreign languages.

Early life 
Kabir Rafi was born to Shaik Abdul Khader in Vishakapatnam, lived in and travelled to various cities in India including Mumbai, Bengaluru, Assam (Silchar) and Gujarat (Bhuj), then settled in Hyderabad. His family has an army background with his great-grandfather a "freedom fighter". His grandfather and father also served in the Indian army where his father, a retired subedar major, His Father is a huge fan of singer Mohammed Rafi and used to listen and cherish his songs and films during his service days in borders,  with the inspiration and influence of mohammed Rafi on him, he gave that name to his child. Rafi works professionally in the music field today following the encouragement of his father and mother. He did his bachelor's degree in hotel management from Regency College in 2009 and was an MBA graduate of 2011.  He worked with Just Dial Company for 2 years on a contract basis as a video vendor after MBA . But his music career was on the go along with his studies since childhood. Rafi started performing at the age of 12 with various music stage shows and learned Hindustani classical music in vocals & Tabla (Pratham swash 1st grade).  His mother recognised his talent and encouraged him to learn music and participate in various stage shows, singing competitions, etc. His father was serving in the Indian Army transferred to  Mumbai where Rafi started his professional career singing various jingle and dubbing songs & tracks for music directors including Dilip Sen who guided him in 2005. As he was getting a lot of opportunities from Tollywood, his home industry, he got shifted to Hyderabad in 2006. He was given a lot of background music work for various top music directors as Asst. Composer, singer and keyboard player. He also sang track songs for them. One of the music directors who encouraged him was late Chakri in his early stages. Then he joined Composer Jeevan Thomas in 2009 for four years, observed, worked & learnt various professional aspects of Music under his class.

Career 
From 2012 to 2014 he was under observation and worked in the musical team of musician & music director Jeevan Thomas for the movies Kuberulu, First love (2013) and Yavvanam Oka Fantasy (2015). He also got opportunity to sing songs in Telugu, Kannada and Hindi as playback singer for a few movies.  He gave stage performances as singer for more than 100 plus events. In 2014 he finished his first movie as full-fledged music direction debut Manasu palike maya prema. audio got release. Then in 2016 his independent film Parinayam was released.  His second feature film, Komali audio was released in 2017. He finished with 200 Projects from the year 2015 to  present which includes short films, independent films, web series, feature films, adds etc. in Telugu, Tamil, Kannada, Hindi & English. His most popular projects which went viral and brought fame are Mana Mugguri Love Story,  Mrs Subbalaxmi, Konchan Istam Chaala Kastam, I Hate You, Aa Gang Repu, Maa Naana Kosam, Pilli Kalla Papa, Oye Nandu, Atu itu nuvvey, etc. Critically acclaimed short films include  She, Musalman, Papa, Anandmaaye, Chotu, Karmama and many more.  His total musical view count on YouTube is nearing to 4 crores views which makes him the highest viewed musician in short film category 2015- 2018 on YouTube in India. His upcoming feature film projects are under production to be released in 2021- 2022.

Awards and nominations
 Awarded with siima short film awards for the best music director for "KICK" short film by Tharun Bhascker Dhaassyam (Director of PELLICHUPULU), hosted by Allu Sirish, Rana Daggubati, and Navdeep.
Won 'Best Short Film Music Director – Telugu' Award for Koncham Ishtam Chala Kashtam at 1st SIIMA Short Film Awards.
(MCIFA) melbourne city independent film awards for BEST SOUND DESIGNER for short film Insight directed by kamal Krishna
Awarded With Studio One film awards for the best music director 
 Awarded With Lotus Short film Awards 2018 for best music director for Aa Gang Repu 2.
Nominated in Telangana_state_Language_and_Culture_department short film festival
Awarded With Lotus Short film Awards 2017 for best singer for voice of eyes.
Awarded with Indie Fest Short Film Award 2015 for best background music for short film "Aa gang repu"
 Awarded with a national award from VR films national award 2016 for best music for song "yedo maya chesav". in short film category.
Nominated in Lotus Short film Awards 2016 for Maa Naana Kosam & parinayam for best song and singer.
 Nominated in Lotus Short film Awards 2016 for Aa gang repu & Koncham istam chaala kastam for best music.
 Felicitated with Short film Diamond Award 2017 towards Contribution of Music in Tollywood short film industry for 2 years to till date presented by Tollywood director and producers Raj Kandukuri, lyric writer Chandra Bose & producer T.Rama Satya Narayana.

Discography

Feature films

Web series

Short, independent and mini movies

Singles and album songs

As playback singer

As Sound Designer

References

External links

1986 births
Living people
Telugu film score composers